Ha Kang-Jin (Hangul: 하강진; born 30 January 1989) is a South Korean football goalkeeper who most recently played for Korea National League side Gimhae FC.

Honors 
Seongnam Ilhwa Chunma

2011 FA Cup Winner

External links

1989 births
Living people
Association football goalkeepers
South Korean footballers
Suwon Samsung Bluewings players
Seongnam FC players
Gyeongnam FC players
Bucheon FC 1995 players
Gangneung City FC players
K League 1 players
K League 2 players
Korea National League players